Together – Civic Democracy was a conservative-liberal and environmentalist political party in Slovakia. It was established in 2018.

History 

SPOLU was announced on 17 November 2017, by former under-secretary of Sieť Miroslav Beblavý, who left the party in protest of its decision to join the Smer-led government, and former under-secretary of liberal SaS Jozef Mihál.

The party presents itself as a centre-right, pro-European party focusing on a modern economy, accessible healthcare and a functional educational system.

The Fonding Council of SPOLU consists of independent MPs of the National Council of the Slovak Republic and former members of Sieť, SaS and OĽaNO: Oto Žarnay, Jozef Mihál, Simona Petrík, Viera Dubačová, Miroslav Beblavý, Katarína Macháčková and lawyer Pavel Nechala of Transparency International.

The party's founding congress was held on 14 April 2018 in Poprad. Miroslav Beblavý was elected as its leader. Katarína Macháčková and Jozef Mihál were elected as Deputy leaders, with the third Deputy leader being Erik Baláž, founder of environmentalist campaign We are the forest, and recipient of the White Crow 2017 award for the fight against corruption.

See also 
 Politics of Slovakia
 List of political parties in Slovakia

References 

2018 establishments in Slovakia
Conservative liberal parties
Liberal conservative parties in Slovakia
Political parties established in 2018
Political parties disestablished in 2023
Pro-European political parties in Slovakia